The Reform Labour Party (PTR) was a political party in Brazil founded in 1985.

In 1993 the party merged with the Social Labour Party into Progressive Party.

In 1995 the Progressive Party merged with the Reform Progressive Party into Brazilian Progressive Party, which re-changed its name to the Progressive Party in 2003.

Political history of Brazil
Defunct political parties in Brazil
Political parties established in 1985
1985 establishments in Brazil
Political parties disestablished in 1993
1993 disestablishments in Brazil
Labour parties